Pătrăuți is a commune located in Suceava County, Romania. It is composed of a single village, Pătrăuți.

The Church of the Holy Cross is located in the commune.

References

Communes in Suceava County
Localities in Southern Bukovina